An altered book is a form of mixed media artwork that changes a book from its original form into a different form, altering its appearance and/or meaning.

An altered book artist takes a book (old, new, recycled or multiple) and modifies it in any of various ways, such as cutting, tearing or folding, or embedding objects.

Altered books may be as simple as adding a drawing or text to a page, or as complex as creating an intricate book sculpture. Antique or Victorian art is frequently used.  Altered books are shown and sold in art galleries and on the Internet.

An exhibition of altered books by contemporary artists was shown at the Bellevue Arts Museum in 2009, titled The Book Borrowers.  It contained 31 works, books transformed into sculptural works. The John Michael Kohler Arts Center was to host an exhibition of altered books in early 2010.

An interesting example of sculpture-like altered books can be found in the mysterious paper sculptures left in various cultural institutions in Scotland, such as the Scottish Poetry Library and the National Library of Scotland.

Recycling old books and using them as art journals has also become popular with some art bloggers and proponents of upcycling.

See also
Artist's book
Found object

References

http://thisiscentralstation.com/featured/mysterious-paper-sculptures/
https://mixedmedia.club/a-crash-course-on-altered-books/ A Crash Course on Altered Books

External links

Lisa Kokin - altered book artist
 Book Folding Art Site - altered book artist and free patterns
 Corinne Stubson - altered book artist
Altered Books Gallery - Altered books, tips and techniques
Tom Philip's A Humument
Jacqueline Rush Lee homepage
How to create an art journal
Guy Laramée's home page
Altered Books entry, Book art library guide at University of South Dakota
Bound and unbound II: University of South Dakota
Bound and unbound III: University of South Dakota 
A Crash Course on Altered Books
Go Make Something: Altered Books
All About Altered Books

Visual arts media
Book arts
Books in art